André Maelbrancke (23 April 1918 – 26 September 1986) was a Belgian racing cyclist. He won the Belgian national road race title in 1942.

References

External links

1918 births
1986 deaths
Belgian male cyclists
People from Torhout
Cyclists from West Flanders